Michel Lomme (born 16 September 1955 in Uccle) is a former Belgian footballer who played as right back.

Honours

Club 

 RSC Anderlecht

 Belgian Cup: 1975–76
 European Cup Winners' Cup: 1975–76 (winners), 1976-77 (runners-up)
 European Super Cup: 1976
 Amsterdam Tournament: 1976
 Jules Pappaert Cup: 1977
 Belgian Sports Merit Award: 1978

References 

1955 births
Living people
Belgian footballers
R.S.C. Anderlecht players
Royale Union Saint-Gilloise players
Association football defenders